Realization, for U.S. Federal income tax purposes, is a requirement in determining what must be included as income subject to taxation. It should not be confused with the separate concept of Recognition (tax).

Income
Realization is a trigger for calculating income taxation. It is one of the three principles for defining income under the seminal case in this area of tax law, Commissioner v. Glenshaw Glass Co. In that case, the Supreme Court interpreted a statute under the tax code and determined that income generally means "undeniable accessions to wealth, clearly realized, and over which the taxpayers have complete dominion." It is also discussed in Helvering v. Bruun, in which the court explained that "the realization of gain need not be in cash derived from the sale of an asset. Gain may occur as a result of exchange of property, payment of the taxpayer's indebtedness, relief from a liability, or other profit realized from the completion of a transaction." That is a checklist of types of realization triggers, but it is not an exhaustive list. For instance, merely finding something of value can be a realization trigger, as the case of Cesarini v. United States demonstrates.

In Cottage Savings Ass'n v. Commissioner, 499 U.S. 554, 559 (1991), the Supreme Court, interpreting section 1001(a) of the tax code, stated:

Problems in line-drawing
Realization is generally straightforward, but there are instances at the margins in which the moment of realization can be tricky. One example of a tricky realization situation that has given rise to substantial debate is the 62nd home run ball hit by Mark McGwire. The ball was retrieved by a grounds crewman, Tim Forneris. Forneris gave McGwire the ball immediately after the game amid speculation that the ball could fetch at least $1 million in an auction. Did either McGwire or Forneris have gross income? Did Forneris realize income when he caught the ball? Tax professors typically teach that it was income to Forneris when he caught it because it was treasure trove. As a result, the person who catches a home run ball would generally be required to include the value of the ball in income in the year in which the catch took place, whether or not the person sold the ball and even whether he gave it back to the player or the team, or even destroyed it. 

This is an unpopular result and the Internal Revenue Service (IRS) issued Ruling 98-56 to change the result in the face of public pressure, but only in the case in which the player returned the ball. Under that theory, an individual who catches a record-breaking ball has income at the very moment he possesses it unless he immediately disclaims possession by returning it to the player or team. If he does not do that, the only remaining question is what value he ought to include in income of the next tax return. Because the treasure trove rule is that the value at the time the ball is "reduced to possession," the answer must be a reasonable estimate of its market value, whether or not the recipient sells the ball.

References

See also
Amount Realized

Taxation in the United States